Julia "Julie" Johnson (born November 16, 1958) is an American actress who voiced the character Baby Bop on the PBS television series Barney & Friends.

Early life 
She was the valedictorian of the 1977 graduating class of Whitewright High School, in Whitewright, Texas, according to the Whitewright Sun.

She married Dylan Paul Thomas in 1981, but divorced in 1987. They had one child. She was nominated for Drama Desk Award for Outstanding Actress in a Musical in 1995 and the Helen Hayes Awards for outstanding Supporting Performer, Visiting Production, in 2013.

Career 
More current roles include "A Closer Walk with Patsy Cline". See Sherman's Herald Democrat article for more biographical information on her early life leading to her current roles.

External links 
 

1958 births
American voice actresses
Living people
People from Whitewright, Texas
21st-century American actresses